Park Road 27 or PR 27 is a Texas park road that runs from Fannin to the Fannin Battleground State Historic Site, which is the site of the Battle of Coleto. PR 27 was originally SH 162 and briefly Spur 91 before gaining its current designation in 1940.

Route description
PR 27 begins within Fannin Battleground State Historic Site, forming a loop around the park. After the loop, the park road heads west and intersects Farm to Market Road 2506 (FM 2506). At this point, PR 27 turns north on a two-lane undivided road, heading through open fields. The road heads into the community of Fannin and passes homes. PR 27 reaches their northern terminus at an interchange with US 59, where the road continues north as  FM 2987.

History
The route was originally designated as State Highway 162 but was redesignated as Spur 91 in May 1940, only to be promptly redesignated again in July as Park Road 27.  SH 162 has not been used since.

Major intersections

See also

References

External links

0027